Statistics of Czechoslovak First League in the 1985–86 season.

Overview
It was contested by 16 teams, and FC Vítkovice won the championship. Stanislav Griga was the league's top scorer with 19 goals.

Stadia and locations

League standings

Results

Top goalscorers

References

Czechoslovakia - List of final tables (RSSSF)

Czechoslovak First League seasons
Czech
1985–86 in Czechoslovak football